During World War II, hundreds of thousands of non-Jewish Polish citizens were imprisoned in Nazi concentration camps for various reasons, including Polish resistance movement in World War II.

In Auschwitz alone, there were between 130,000 and 150,000 Polish prisoners, about half of them who perished during their incarceration.

References

Further reading
 

Nazi concentration camps
Polish people of World War II